Daniel Muñoz Perez (born 22 March 1989) is a Colombian archer competing in compound events. He won the bronze medal in the men's individual compound event at the 2019 Pan American Games held in Lima, Peru. He also won the gold medal in the men's individual compound event at the 2022 Bolivarian Games held in Valledupar, Colombia.

Career 

He won the bronze medal in the men's team compound event at the 2017 World Archery Championships held in Mexico City, Mexico.

Muñoz and Sara López won the gold medal in the mixed team compound event at 2022 World Games held in Birmingham, United States. Muñoz also competed in the men's individual compound event.

Achievements

References

External links
 

Living people
1989 births
Place of birth missing (living people)
Colombian male archers
World Archery Championships medalists
Central American and Caribbean Games medalists in archery
Central American and Caribbean Games bronze medalists for Colombia
Competitors at the 2018 Central American and Caribbean Games
South American Games gold medalists for Colombia
South American Games silver medalists for Colombia
South American Games medalists in archery
Competitors at the 2018 South American Games
Archers at the 2019 Pan American Games
Medalists at the 2019 Pan American Games
Pan American Games bronze medalists for Colombia
Pan American Games medalists in archery
Competitors at the 2022 World Games
World Games gold medalists
World Games medalists in archery
21st-century Colombian people